Mesophleps cycnobathra is a moth of the family Gelechiidae. It is found in Australia (New South Wales).

References

Moths described in 1898
Mesophleps